Volodino is a rural locality (a selo) in Dubovskoye Rural Settlement, Beryozovsky District, Perm Krai, Russia. The population was 69 as of 2010.

Geography 
Volodino is located 15 km northwest of  Beryozovka (the district's administrative centre) by road. Dubovoye is the nearest rural locality.

References 

Rural localities in Beryozovsky District, Perm Krai